Machekeh or Machkeh, also rendered as Machgeh, may refer to:
 Machekeh-ye Olya
 Machekeh-ye Sofla